This is a list of the Sites of Special Scientific Interest (SSSIs) in the Pembrokeshire Area of Search (AoS).

Sites

References

Pembrokeshire
Pembrokeshire